Manchester is a city in Delaware Township, Delaware County, Iowa, United States. The population was 5,065 at the time of the 2020 census. It is the county seat of Delaware County. Manchester is located at the intersection of U.S. Route 20 and State Highway 13 and is the largest community in Delaware County.

History
 Manchester was founded in the 1850s. It was originally called Burrington after its founder, Levings Burrington, who settled there in 1852. The name was subsequently changed to Manchester.

The county courthouse was built in 1894 for $38,000. The clock in the tower was paid for with contributions from 700 county citizens. C.E. Bell designed the Romanesque Revival building,[1] which is constructed of red pressed brick. The main body of the building measures 76 by 100 feet.[3] The tower and spire are 135 feet (41 m) high, and the walls of the building are 18 inches (45.7 cm) thick.[3] The decorative metal ceilings on the first floor and the elaborate woodwork are original to the building. It was listed on the National Register of Historic Places in 1981 as a part of the County Courthouses in Iowa Thematic Resource.

Geography
The community is located along the Maquoketa River.

Demographics

2010 census
As of the census of 2010, there were 5,179 people, 2,199 households, and 1,391 families living in the city. The racial makeup of the city was 97.7% White, 0.6% African American, 0.3% Native American, 0.4% Asian, 0.2% from other races, and 0.8% from two or more races. Hispanic or Latino of any race made up 0.9% of the population.

There were 2,199 households, of which 30.0% had children under the age of 18 living with them, 49.5% were married couples living together, 10.3% had a female householder with no husband present, 3.5% had a male householder with no wife present, and 36.7% were non-families. 32.3% of all households were made up of individuals, and 15.3% had someone living alone who was 65 years of age or older. The average household size was 2.31 and the average family size was 2.91.

The median age in the city was 41.1 years. 24.9% of residents were under the age of 18; 7% were between the ages of 18 and 24; 22.8% were from 25 to 44; 25.2% were from 45 to 64; and 20.1% were 65 years of age or older. The gender makeup of the city was 47.4% male and 52.6% female.

2000 census
As of the census of 2000, there were 5,257 people, 2,167 households, and 1,397 families living in the city. The racial makeup of the city was 98.99% White, 0.10% African American, 0.15% Native American, 0.27% Asian, 0.04% Pacific Islander, 0.06% from other races, and 0.40% from two or more races. Hispanic or Latino of any race were 0.82% of the population.

There were 2,167 households, out of which 31.7% had children under the age of 18 living with them, 52.3% were married couples living together, 9.3% had a female householder with no husband present, and 35.5% were non-families. 31.6% of all households were made up of individuals, and 15.4% had someone living alone who was 65 years of age or older. The average household size was 2.36 and the average family size was 2.99.

Age spread: 26.2% under the age of 18, 7.6% from 18 to 24, 26.6% from 25 to 44, 19.6% from 45 to 64, and 20.0% who were 65 years of age or older. The median age was 38 years. For every 100 females, there were 87.5 males. For every 100 females age 18 and over, there were 82.4 males.

The median income for a household in the city was $31,099, and the median income for a family was $39,219. Males had a median income of $33,506 versus $17,990 for females. The per capita income for the city was $18,811. About 8.4% of families and 9.8% of the population were below the poverty line, including 12.0% of those under age 18 and 10.5% of those age 65 or over.

Economy

Manchester serves as the county seat of Delaware County, which is a major employer.

Manchester's largest area employers include; XL Specialized Trailers, Paladin Attachments, Henderson Products, Regional Medical Center, and West Delaware Community School District, with many other strong small businesses throughout Delaware County. Agriculture is a major component of the local economy.

Manchester is located within  of Cedar Rapids, Waterloo and Dubuque, three of the state's larger cities.

Notable people
Robert Gallery - former NFL O-Lineman and first round draft pick of the Oakland Raiders out of the University of Iowa.

Parks and recreation
Manchester completed the construction phase of a Whitewater Park in the spring of 2015 and opened the park on June 20, 2015. The park is located on a section of the Maquoketa River that runs through the downtown district.  This park is approximately 900 feet long and features six 18" drops.

A concrete Skate Park was built in 2013, located at Central Park.

Manchester is home to the Manchester Trout Hatchery, which dates back to the 1890s. The facility also functions as the Iowa DNR NE Regional Office for Fisheries, Wildlife and Law Enforcement.

Manchester & Delaware County resides over 35 Parks that cover 2,000+ acres.  Delaware County is also home to Backbone State Park, Iowa's first state park and remains one of the most geographically unique.

The Manchester Family Aquatic Center features 3 water slides, diving board, zero depth entry, spray fountains, sand volleyball and concessions.

Education
Manchester is part of the West Delaware County Community School District in Delaware County, which includes West Delaware High School, Middle School and Lambert Elementary. The school's mascot is the Hawks.  In addition, St. Mary's Catholic School also serves PreK-6th.

West Delaware High School was designated by the United States Department of Education as a 2012 National Blue Ribbon School. This coveted award is based on their overall academic excellence.  Just two high schools were awarded this designation in the State of Iowa in 2012.

West Delaware's Lambert Elementary and Middle School were recognized as a HealthierUS Bronze School in 2014, which is also nationally recognized.

References

External links

 
City of Manchester
Manchester Chamber of Commerce
City-Data Comprehensive Statistical Data and more about Manchester

Cities in Iowa
Cities in Delaware County, Iowa
County seats in Iowa
1852 establishments in Iowa
Populated places established in 1852